Emamzadeh Ebrahim (also Romanized as Emāmzādeh Ebrāhīm) is a village in Radkan Rural District, in the Central District of Chenaran County, Razavi Khorasan Province, Iran. At the 2006 census, its population was 22, in 6 families.

References 

Populated places in Chenaran County